Paghilom (Eng: Breathe) is Dicta License's first LP album under Warner Music Philippines and was released last September 21, 2005. The album has an evident socio-political theme that speaks mostly to the youth about evident issues in the Philippines.

Track listing

Band 
 Pochoy Labog - vocals
 Boogie Romero - guitars / vocals
 Kelley Mangahas - bass
 Bryan Makasiar - drums

Credits 
 Executive Producer - Ricky R. Ilacad
 Project Coordinator - Frey Zambrano
 Album Cover Design - Nix Puno

References 

Dicta License albums
2005 albums